The 2020–21 Ole Miss Rebels men's basketball team represented the University of Mississippi in the 2020–21 NCAA Division I men's basketball season, their 111th basketball season. The Rebels were led by third-year head coach, Kermit Davis. The Rebels played their games at The Pavilion at Ole Miss in Oxford, Mississippi as members of the Southeastern Conference. They finished the season 16-12, 10-8 to finish in 6th place. They defeated South Carolina in the second round in the SEC Tournament before losing in the quarterfinals to LSU. They received an invitation to the NIT where they lost in the first round to Louisiana Tech.

Previous season
The Rebels finished the 2019–20 season 15–17, 6–12 in SEC play to finish in twelfth place. They lost in the first round of the SEC tournament to Georgia.

Offseason

Departures

2020 recruiting class

Incoming transfers

Preseason

SEC media poll
The SEC media poll was released on November 12, 2020.

Roster

Schedule and results
Due to the ongoing coronavirus pandemic, the start of the season was pushed back from the scheduled start of November 10. On September 16, 2020, the NCAA announced that November 25 would be the new start date.

On November 17, the school announced that head coach Kermit Davis had tested positive for coronavirus. On November 23, the school announced that the first four scheduled games would be canceled.
|-
!colspan=12 style=|Regular season

|-
!colspan=12 style=| SEC tournament

|-
!colspan=12 style=| NIT

See also
2020–21 Ole Miss Rebels women's basketball team

References 

Ole Miss
Ole Miss Rebels men's basketball seasons
Ole Miss Rebels men's basketball
Ole Miss Rebels men's basketball
Ole Miss